Drac (which means dragon or devil in some languages), Dracs or DRAC may refer to:

Geography
 Drac (river), France, a tributary of the Isère
 Drac County, a county of the Kingdom of Serbia from 1912 to 1913
 Drač, Podgorica, Montenegro - see List of Podgorica neighbourhoods and suburbs

DRAC
 DRAC (Dynamic Relay Authorization Control), a daemon that dynamically updates a relay authorization map for sendmail
 Dell DRAC (Dell Remote Access Controller), a remote-access card available in many models of Dell servers
 Dongfeng Renault Automobile Company, a Chinese joint venture between car manufacturers Dongfeng and Renault
 Direction régionale des affaires culturelles, a heritage service in one of each of the regions of France
 Badalona Dracs, an American-football team based in Badalona, Catalonia, Spain

Other uses
 Drac, abbreviation for the orchid genus Dracula
 Drac, nickname of the trans-Neptunian object 
 Dracs, an alien species in Barry B. Longyear's The Enemy Papers novel trilogy
 Drac, one of the title characters of Dracula Twins, a video game
 , an aquatic daemon or fairy-folk in the French folklore of Beaucaire and Arles, France
 Marc Hicks ("Drac"), co-founder and guitarist of the now-defunct band Slave